Roger S. Hayes is a Criminal Court Judge in New York City.  He also served as acting United States Attorney for the Southern District of New York for part of June 1993.

Hayes received his bachelor's degree from Cornell University in 1965 and his JD from New York University School of Law in 1968.  Hayes served over the years as assistant District Attorney for New York County, Chief of Legal Systems Analysis for the State of New York Division of Criminal Justice Services and Deputy United States Attorney for the Southern District of New York.

Sources
Mayor's Advisory Committee on the Judiciary biography of Hayes

Cornell University alumni
New York University School of Law alumni
Living people
Year of birth missing (living people)
Place of birth missing (living people)
American judges